Cai Haoyu (born 1987) is a Chinese businessman, investor, and video game producer. He is best known as the co-founder, Chairman and CEO of the Chinese game company miHoYo. The Chinese magazine New Fortune ranked Cai in 73rd place on the "2022 New Fortune 500 Rich List" that ranks the 500 richest people in China.

Early life 
Cai was born in Jinan, Shandong, in 1987. His parents, who both work as computer subject-related instructors, began teaching him about computers after noticing his interest for it beginning when he was five years old and exhibiting his aptitude for it. In 1995, Cai received second place in the animation category in the youth division of the National Computer Competition. In 1996, he received the "Top Ten Teenagers in Tianqiao District, Jinan City" award. In 1998, his "Alien Envoy" and "Blue-Eared Spaceship" submissions received second place in the animation category in the youth division of the National Computer Competition. In February 1999 when he was 12 years old, he was elected to the Chinese Youth Academy of Sciences in the first group of junior academicians chosen. He said in an interview, "The computer is not a dead thing. It changes all the time. I have to keep learning to keep up with it."

Also at an early age, the young Cai exhibited entrepreneurial proclivities, which also influenced him as a youth to "conduct business." One of his first business ventures as a teenager was when he bought Xiaolingtong cordless telephones for cheap and sold them for a profit. As a junior in high school, he sold watches as a side venture.

Cai attended Jinan Baliqiao Primary School, Jinan Foreign Language School, and Shandong Experimental High School. He matriculated at Shanghai Jiaotong University when the institution admitted him as a student in 2005. He majored in computer science and also went on to earn a master's degree from the same university.

Career 
At Shanghai Jiaotong, Cai became roommates with Liu Wei and Luo Yuhao. He and his roommates became drawn to the ACG subculture of animation, comics, and games. In 2009, they made video games with ACG as the theme including as their graduation project. Cai started making his first game FlyMe2theMoon in 2010. Two years later, it received its first and only angel investment worth 1million RMB.

In January 2011, using the grant, they established miHoYo in a university dormitory while they were second-year graduate students. It began as a literary open source community. Cai is the chairman of miHoYo, which by 2021, made over ¥10billion (US$1.4billion) in revenue. Chinese Business Strategy, a media company that profiles businesspeople, said Cai "tends to think intuitively, is responsible for business strategy decisions, and is meticulous about affairs management".

In May 2022, New Fortune, a Chinese magazine, published the "2022 New Fortune 500 Rich List" ranking the 500 richest people in China. Cai made his first appearance on the list in 73rd place at ¥56billion (US$8.7billion). Among the first 100 people on the list, Cai was the only person who made his fortune in the Chinese video game industry. He is the richest person in Jinan.

References

External links 
 Official website

1987 births
Living people
Billionaires from Shandong
Businesspeople from Shandong
Businesspeople in software
Chinese computer businesspeople
Chinese investors
Chinese technology chief executives
Chinese technology company founders
Chinese computer programmers
Child businesspeople
People from Jinan
Shanghai Jiao Tong University alumni
Video game producers